Fort Madison is a city in Lee County, Iowa.

History
Fort Madison was organized in 1841.

References

Townships in Lee County, Iowa
Townships in Iowa